The naval Battle of Fidonisi took place on 14 July 1788 (OS) between the fleets of the Russian Empire and the Ottoman Empire during the Russo-Turkish War (1787–1792) in the area of Snake Island, which in Greek was called Fidonisi (Φιδονήσι). It was a Russian victory.

Events
On 10 July, the Turkish fleet under Kapudan Pasha (Grand Admiral) Hasan Pasha was seen to the NW by the Russian fleet, which had left Sevastopol under Rear-Admiral Count Voynovitch on 29 June and had reached Tendra on 10 July. After three days of manoeuvering or lying becalmed in sight of one another, the fleets found themselves near the island of Fidonisi, about 100 miles south of Kinburn.

Voynovitch formed a line on the port tack NE and then SE as the wind veered. The Turks bore up and attacked from windward just after 3 pm. The leading Russian ships, the frigates Berislav and Stryela, forced the leading Turks out of line, but were in danger of being cut off until the Russian second-in-command Fyodor Ushakov aboard Sv. Pavel closed the gap.

Hasan Pasha then attacked the leading Russian ships, while his Vice- and Rear-Admirals attacked Voynovitch, but his ship damaged, Hasan himself had to leave the line and just before 5 pm the Turks withdrew. They had lost 1 xebec, which was sunk.

Between 15 and 17 July, the Russian and Turkish fleets manoeuvered to the west of the Crimea; on 18 July, the Turks had disappeared. They sailed back to Ochakov but made no attack.

Ships involved

Russia (Count Voynovitch)
Preobrazhenie Gospodne 66 (Преображение Господне 66)
Sv. Pavel 66 (Св. Павел 66)
Sv. Andrei 50
Sv. Georgii 50
Legkii 44
Perun 44
Pobyeda 44
Stryela 44
Berislav 40
Fanagoria 40
Kinburn 40
Taganrog 34
24 small craft

Turkey (Hassan el Ghazi)
5 80-gun battleships
12 other battleships
8 frigates
21 xebecs – 1 sunk
3 bombs
Some small craft

In popular culture
The battle was depicted in the movie "Admiral Ushakov" by Mikhail Romm.

See also
 Attack on Snake Island, an attack on the island in 2022

References

Bibliography
 

Conflicts in 1788
Fidonisi 1788
Military history of the Black Sea
1788 in the Russian Empire
1788 in the Ottoman Empire
Military history of Ukraine
1780s in Ukraine
Snake Island (Ukraine)